Yang Xiangzhong (born September 29, 1974) is a retired male boxer from PR China. He twice competed for his native Asian country at the Summer Olympics: 1996 and 2000. At his Olympic debut in Atlanta, Georgia he was defeated in the second round of the men's light flyweight division (– 48 kg) by Morocco's Hamid Berhili.

References

 sports-reference

1974 births
Living people
Flyweight boxers
Boxers at the 1996 Summer Olympics
Boxers at the 2000 Summer Olympics
Olympic boxers of China
Asian Games medalists in boxing
Boxers at the 1998 Asian Games
Chinese male boxers
Asian Games silver medalists for China
Medalists at the 1998 Asian Games